Bellaterra is a railway station on the Sabadell branch of the Barcelona-Vallès line of the FGC, located in the Bellaterra neighborhood of Cerdanyola del Vallès, about 17 km from Barcelona in Spain.

Construction began in 1929 and the station opened on 22 June 1930.

References

Stations on the Barcelona–Vallès Line
Railway stations in Spain opened in 1930